The D IX steam locomotive was manufactured by the firm of Maffei between 1888 and 1899 for the Royal Bavarian State Railways (Königlich Bayerische Staatsbahn). They were used on the route from Reichenhall via Freilassing to Salzburg. After one engine had been successfully employed on the route to Berchtesgaden, the vehicles were also deployed on the suburban lines of Augsburg, Munich and Nuremberg. 

There were scarcely any differences between the various build series. Not until 1896 were minor changes made to the heating areas, the weights and the coal and water capacities. The rigid mounting of the driving and carrying wheels and the location of the cylinder just in front of the carrying wheel did not prove a success.

Apart from one engine, which had already been retired by Bavaria, the Reichsbahn took on all the engines. Some were taken out of service even before 1925, the rest had followed by 1932.

No examples of the Bavarian D IX have been preserved.

See also
 Royal Bavarian State Railways
 List of Bavarian locomotives and railbuses

References

2-4-0T locomotives
D 09
Standard gauge locomotives of Germany
Maffei locomotives
Railway locomotives introduced in 1888
Scrapped locomotives